Massachusetts House of Representatives' 8th Bristol district in the United States is one of 160 legislative districts included in the lower house of the Massachusetts General Court. It covers part of Bristol County. Democrat Paul Schmid of Westport has represented the district since 2011.

Locales represented
The district includes the following localities:
 part of Fall River
 part of Freetown
 part of New Bedford
 Westport

The current district geographic boundary overlaps with those of the Massachusetts Senate's 1st Bristol and Plymouth and 2nd Bristol and Plymouth districts.

Former locale
The district previously covered Dartmouth, circa 1927.

Representatives
 Ezra P. Brownell, circa 1858-1859 
 William Alexander Carman, circa 1888 
 James Conroy, circa 1888 
 Andrew Quinn, circa 1888 
 William J. Bullock, circa 1920 
 Andrew P. Doyle, circa 1920 
 Edgar F. Howland, circa 1920 
 Joseph Douglas Saulnier, circa 1951 
 John J. Long, circa 1975 
 Charles E. Silvia
 Edward M. Lambert Jr.
 Michael Rodrigues
 Paul Schmid, III, 2011-current

See also
 List of Massachusetts House of Representatives elections
 Other Bristol County districts of the Massachusetts House of Representatives: 1st, 2nd, 3rd, 4th, 5th, 6th, 7th, 9th, 10th, 11th, 12th, 13th, 14th
 List of Massachusetts General Courts
 List of former districts of the Massachusetts House of Representatives

Images

References

External links
 Ballotpedia
  (State House district information based on U.S. Census Bureau's American Community Survey).

House
Government of Bristol County, Massachusetts